El Rodeo is a municipality in the San Marcos department of Guatemala, founded on 12 March 1834. Since 1954 it is known as San Jose el Rodeo.

Geographic location

El Rodeo is surrounded by San Marcos Department municipalities.

See also

References

Municipalities of the San Marcos Department